East Donegal was a UK Parliament constituency in County Donegal, Ireland, returning one Member of Parliament from 1885 to 1922.

Prior to the 1885 general election, the area was part of the Donegal constituency. From 1922, on the establishment of the Irish Free State, it was not represented in the UK Parliament.

Boundaries
This constituency comprised the eastern part of County Donegal, consisting of the baronies of Raphoe North and Raphoe South, that part of the barony of Inishowen West contained within the parish of Burt, and that part of the barony of Kilmacrenan not contained within the constituencies of North Donegal or West Donegal.

Members of Parliament

Elections

Elections in the 1880s

Elections in the 1890s

Elections in the 1900s

Elections in the 1910s

References

Sources 

Westminster constituencies in County Donegal (historic)
Dáil constituencies in the Republic of Ireland (historic)
Constituencies of the Parliament of the United Kingdom established in 1885
Constituencies of the Parliament of the United Kingdom disestablished in 1922